Julia Mortensen (born 28 September 2000) is a Faroese footballer who plays as a midfielder for AGF in the Elitedivisionen and has appeared for the Faroe Islands women's national team.

Career
Mortensen has been capped for the Faroe Islands national team, appearing for the team during the UEFA Women's Euro 2021 qualifying cycle.

International goals

References

External links
 
 

2000 births
Living people
Faroese women's footballers
Faroe Islands women's international footballers
Women's association football midfielders
AGF Fodbold (women) players